Barbara De Angelis (born March 4, 1951) is an American relationship consultant, lecturer and author, TV personality, relationship,  personal growth adviser and spiritual teacher.

Biography
De Angelis received a Ph.D. in psychology from Columbia Pacific University, a now-defunct and non-accredited (but state-approved) university previously located in San Rafael, California.

De Angelis is known for her books that help people find the right partner. She has written fourteen books in these fields, including the New York Times-bestselling books How to Make Love All the Time, Secrets About Men Every Woman Should Know, Are You The One for Me? and Real Moments. Her infomercial "Making Love Work" won an award as Best Infomercial of 1994. She had a short-lived talk show on CBS daytime in early 1991.

She was the founder and executive director of the Los Angeles Personal Growth Center and is president of Shakti Communications, Inc.

De Angelis was born and raised in Philadelphia, and has been married five times as of 1995. Her spouses have included magician Doug Henning and author John Gray, who, along with De Angelis while they were married, received an unaccredited PhD degree by correspondence from the now-defunct Columbia Pacific University.

Books 
 How To Make Love All The Time: Make Love Last a Lifetime (1991)
 
 
 
 Ask Barbara: The 100 Most-Asked Questions About Love, Sex and Relationships (1997)
 Real Moments for Lovers: The Enlightened Guide for Discovering Total Passion and True Intimacy (1997)
 The Real Rules: How to Find the Right Man for the Real You (1997)
 Chicken Soup for the Couple’s Soul (co-editor) (1999)
 
 
 Chicken Soup for the Romantic Soul: Inspirational Stories About Love and Romance (co-editor) (2003)
 
 How Did I Get Here?: Finding Your Way to Renewed Hope and Happiness When Life and Love Take Unexpected Turns (2005)
 
 Soul Shifts (2015)
 The Choice For Love (2017)

References

External links 

 Barbara De Angelis official website
 
 

American women psychologists
21st-century American psychologists
American self-help writers
Writers from Philadelphia
Popular psychology
La Sierra University alumni
Columbia Pacific University alumni
1951 births
Living people
American women non-fiction writers
21st-century American women
20th-century American psychologists